Graff is a British multinational jeweller based in London. It was founded by British jeweller Laurence Graff in 1960. A vertically integrated company, Graff operations comprise the design, manufacture and retail distribution of jewellery and watches.

History
Graff was founded in London in 1960 by Laurence Graff.

Awards
Graff were the first ever jewellers to receive the Queen's Award for Industry and Export (now known as the Queen's Award for Enterprise), awarded in 1973. Since then, the company has received this award a further four times, most recently in 2014. The Queen's Award to Industry and Export award is considered to be the highest accolade for a British company. It is awarded on the advice of the Prime Minister, following thorough examinations of each application by an Advisory Committee formed of leading representatives of industry and commerce.

Sourcing
Graff adheres to the Kimberley Process, never knowingly buying or trading rough diamonds from areas where this would encourage conflict or human suffering. The majority of Graff diamonds are laser engraved with unique Gemological Institute of America (GIA) tracking numbers, which whilst invisible to the naked eye, allow for their origin to be traced. Graff’s cutting and polishing processes are carried out in Johannesburg by the South African Diamond Corporation, a division of Graff.

Notable diamonds
The Windsor Yellows were acquired by Laurence Graff in 1987 in Geneva during the auction of the jewels belonging to Wallis Simpson, Duchess of Windsor. The Duchess was often photographed wearing the Windsor Yellows, a pair of clips of fancy yellow pear shaped diamonds of 51.01 and 40.22 carats respectively. "I also bought another pair of clips the Duchess had owned," Laurence Graff explains. "Of course they needed re-cutting to bring them to their full potential, I bought all four, repolished them, and eventually made the Windsor earrings."

The Paragon diamond was acquired by Graff in 1989.

The Lesotho Promise was acquired as a rough  stone for $12.4 million in 2006. The stone was cut by a team of 35 using computer-controlled lasers into 26 D-flawless diamonds totaling , the highest yield from a single diamond. In July 2007 the finished stones were unveiled. The largest gem cut from the diamond was a   pear-shaped diamond; the smallest a  round brilliant. In all, twenty-six stones were fashioned from the rough gem, figuring as seven pear shapes, four emerald cuts, thirteen round brilliants and one heart shape. The finished gems total .

The Letseng Legacy diamond was unearthed from the same mine as the Lesotho Promise Letseng diamond mine in 2008 and totalled 493cts.  Acquired by Graff for $10.4 million, they yielded 20 diamonds totaling 231.67cts from the one rough stone.

The Wittelsbach-Graff Diamond is a  fancy deep-blue diamond with internally flawless clarity purchased by Laurence Graff in 2008 for £16.4 million.

The Delaire Sunrise is, at 118.08 carats, the largest square emerald cut Fancy Vivid Yellow diamond in the world. Discovered in 2008 at an alluvial mine in South Africa, the 221.81 carat rough diamond. When Laurence Graff unveiled the finished diamond, he named it "the Delaire Sunrise".

The Constellation is, at 102.79 carats, the largest round shaped, D colour, Internally Flawless diamond ever to be graded by the Gemological Institute of America.

The Graff Pink was acquired by Graff in November 2010.  A pink diamond with a type IIa classification and modified emerald cut shape, the diamond was previously held in a private collection for over 60 years. The diamond displayed 25 natural flaws. The recut 23.88 carat diamond displayed new colour, clarity and internal flawlessness.

The Graff Sweethearts were originally two rough diamonds weighing 196 carats and 184 carats discovered at the Letseng Mine in Lesotho. After cutting they produced a 51.53 ct D colour Flawless type IIa and a 50.76 ct D colour Flawless type IIa, both heart-shaped.

The Sultan Abdul Hamid II is a 70.54 carat light yellow acquired by Graff in 1981. It has been suggested that this stone may have been cut from  "The Ottoman I"  which originally belonged to Suleyman the Magnificent of Turkey.

The Graff Lesedi La Rona, a 302.37 carat D color high-clarity emerald cut diamond. It is the main stone cut from the Lesedi La Rona, bought by Graff in 2017 and cut in 2019. The cutting of the rough stone also produced 66 smaller stones. According to Graff, the stone is the "largest highest clarity, highest color diamond ever graded by the Gemological Institute of America (GIA)".

The Peacock Brooch 
Taking the form of a peacock with a display of fanned tail feathers, this diamond brooch features a collection of coloured diamonds. A total of 120.81 carats of diamonds adorn the brooch, which measures a little over 10 cm in height.

This piece is priced at $100 million. At the heart of the brooch, sits a 20.02 carat deep blue pear shape diamond. The piece also features an additional clasp to the rear, allowing the blue diamond centerpiece to be removed and worn two ways.

Stores
Graff has over 50 stores around the world including New York, Las Vegas, Melbourne, Monte Carlo, Courchevel, Kyiv, Beijing and Taipei.

Graff has corporate offices in London, New York, Geneva, Hong Kong and Tokyo.

Graffiti magazine
Graff's bi-annual magazine "Graffiti' was launched in 2009 and is distributed to Graff's customers in both English and Simplified Chinese characters.

Robberies
Graff has been the target of several robberies.

In 1980, two Chicago-based gangsters armed with a handgun and a hand grenade stole jewellery valued at £1.5 million from the Sloane Street premises. Mafiosi Joseph Scalise and Arthur Rachel, who took "less than a minute" to commit the crime, were apprehended eleven hours later in the United States and were extradited to England where they were tried, convicted and imprisoned for nine years. Their haul had included the 26 carat Marlborough diamond, worth £400,000 at the time, which has never been recovered.

In 1993, the firm's Hatton Garden workshop premises was robbed of jewellery valued at £7 million. The robbery was attributed to a group of armed robbers known as The Rascal Gang due to the Bedford Rascal vans they used.

In 2003, the New Bond Street premises was robbed by two men from the Pink Panthers international jewel thief network who stole 47 pieces of jewellery worth £23 million.

In 2005, three armed robbers stole jewellery valued at £2 million from the Sloane Street premises.

In 2007, two robbers, who arrived at the Sloane Street premises in a chauffeur-driven Bentley Continental Flying Spur, threatened staff at gunpoint and stole jewellery worth £10 million. In the same year, the Graff premises in Wafi City, Dubai was targeted by the Pink Panthers again, using two Audi A8 cars to carry out a ram raid. Jewellery worth AED14.7 million (£2.4 million) was taken, although later recovered when two of the gang, both Serbians, were arrested.

In the 2009 Graff Diamonds robbery, which took place on 6 August, two armed robbers stole 43 items with a total worth of nearly £40 million. It was believed to be the largest ever gems heist in Britain at the time, and the second largest British robbery after the £53 million raid on a Securitas depot in Kent in 2006.

References

External links
Official website

Companies based in the City of Westminster
Design companies established in 1960
Diamond dealers
Luxury brands
Retail companies established in 1960